The Hall Mark Stakes is an Australian Turf Club Group 3 Thoroughbred  horse race under set weights with penalties conditions for horses three years old and older, held over a distance of 1200 metres at Randwick Racecourse, Sydney, Australia in April. Prizemoney is A$160,000.

History
The race is named in honour of Hall Mark, who won four signature events at the Sydney Autumn Carnival during his career (1933–36) – AJC Doncaster Handicap, AJC Derby, AJC Champagne Stakes, AJC Sires' Produce Stakes.

Distance
 1978 – 1600 metres
 1979 – 2000 metres
 1980 onwards - 1200 metres

Grade
 1979 - 2013 - Listed race
 2014 onwards - Group 3

Winners

 2022 - Kementari
 2021 - Splintex
 2020 - Greyworm 
 2019 - Trekking 
 2018 - Burning Passion 
 2017 - Redzel 
 2016 - Music Magnate
 2015 - Our Boy Malachi
 2014 - Hot Snitzel
 2013 - Rarefied
 2012 - Tiger Tees
 2011 - Ladys Angel
 2010 - Ego's Dare
 2009 - Kroner
 2008 - Wasted Emotions
 2007 - Anwaar
 2006 - Falaise
 2005 - Presently
 2004 - Academe
 2003 - Polygram
 2002 - Canny Fly
 2001 - Juggling Time 
 2000 - King Lotto 
 1999 - Life Of Riley 
 1998 - Little Lucifer 
 1997 - Winning Hand 
 1996 - Madison Point 
 1995 - Cohort 
 1994 - All Our Mob
 1993 - Simonstad
 1992 - Mocha 
 1991 - Euclase
 1990 - Dieu D'Or 
 1989 - Tumble On 
 1988 - Tumble On 
 1987 - Targlish 
 1986 - Rich Fields Lad 
 1985 - All Chant 
 1984 - Vain Karioi 
 1983 - Toy Pindarri 
 1982 - My Evita 
 1981 - Oswonder 
 1980 - Thai Jewel 
 1979 - Down The Aisle

See also
 List of Australian Group races
 Group races

External links 
First three placegetters Hall Mark Stakes (ATC)

References

Horse races in Australia
Randwick Racecourse